Thomas Speed (October 25, 1768 – February 20, 1842) was a U.S. Representative from Kentucky.

Born in Charlotte County, Virginia, Speed was taught by his father Captain James Speed. He moved with his parents to Kentucky in 1782. He was employed in the office of the clerk of the general court. He engaged in mercantile pursuits at Danville and Bardstown in 1790.
He also engaged in agricultural pursuits. He served as clerk of the Bullitt and Nelson circuit courts. He served as major of Volunteers in the War of 1812.

Speed was elected as a Democratic-Republican to the Fifteenth Congress (March 4, 1817 – March 3, 1819). He was an unsuccessful candidate for reelection. He resumed agricultural pursuits.
He also contributed articles to the National Intelligencer, Washington, D.C.
He served as member of the State house of representatives in 1821, 1822, and again in 1840. He was a member of the Whig Party when it was organized. He died on his farm, "Cottage Grove", near Bardstown, Kentucky, on February 20, 1842, and was interred there.

References

1768 births
1842 deaths
Members of the Kentucky House of Representatives
People from Charlotte County, Virginia
United States Army officers
Democratic-Republican Party members of the United States House of Representatives from Kentucky
Kentucky Whigs
19th-century American politicians